Coleophora hypoxantha is a moth of the family Coleophoridae. It is found in southern Russia.

The larvae feed on the leaves of Kalidium foliatum.

References

hypoxantha
Moths described in 1982
Moths of Europe